Adrian Rodriguez or Adrián Rodríguez may refer to:

Adrián Rodríguez, (born 1988), Spanish actor and singer from Catalonia
Adrian Rodriguez (DJ) {fl. 1994–2002), German trance producer and DJ
Adrian Rodriguez (musician), American musician, member and bassist of The Airborne Toxic Event
Adri Rodrígues (born Adrián Rodrígues Gonçalves, 1988), Andorran international footballer

See also
Adriana Rodríguez Vizcarra (born 1949), Mexican politician